Ahaneith was an ancient Egyptian woman, who lived during the First Dynasty of Egypt. She was named after goddess Neith.

The First Dynasty pharaoh Djet was buried in tomb Z in Umm el-Qa'ab and there is a stele bearing Ahaneith's name in that tomb.  The stele is named UC 14268. Whether Ahaneith was the wife of the king, a royal official or a relative of the king, is not known.

References

People of the First Dynasty of Egypt
30th-century BC women